Luanshya Boys High School is a high school located in Luanshya, Copperbelt Province, Zambia. The school was founded in 1957.

The school underwent a change from a secondary school to a high school in 2009. The school, like most government high schools, is mostly funded by user fees from pupils.

History
The school has been noted as one of the schools that has been in existence since the Northern Rhodesia British colonial period in Zambia's history.

Luanshya Boys High School was first a co-ed school. It was also one of the first schools to accept non-white students in January 1964 following Northern Rhodesia becoming semi-independent following the break up of the Federation of Rhodesia and Nyasaland at the end of 1963. 

Later in 1964 when Zambia became an independent nation, the school, like most others of a similar nature become fully integrated. Also at that time school fees were payable, but only by the 1964 intake and throughout their five years at the school. Those prior and those who followed did not pay.  
By 1998 the school was virtually 100% African students as most non-Africans had left the town or preferred to send their children down south or overseas for their education.  Why I don't know as I had a very good time there and the quality was good. 

Luanshya Secondary school also had the distinguished record of being the first schools whose Cadet Contingent won the prestigious Presidents Banner in 1968 by winning almost all the 1st Battalion ZCCF competitions and then beating the champion contingent of the 2nd Battalion in a falling plates shooting competition at the ABTA Camp of 1968. The banner was handed over to us by Brigadier Gen Grigg, then commander of the Zambia Army, on behalf of President Kenneth Kaunda. We proudly carried that banner through Luanshya after the war memorial that year, from the war memorial (cenotaph) near the mine club, all the way back to the school, a march of about 4 km, in full uniform and in November, when it was pretty sweltering.

The school is run by the help of a Student Body or School Council which consists of elected representatives from various classes. The term of office for the Councillors is one year.  The school council in the 1960s was chaired by the headmaster, Mr S Bottom and consisted of him, two other senior staff members, head prefects (boys and girls) and one class rep from each year.  Although we had no real say in the running of the school, there was opportunity to get our views across to the authorities and, at times, made things better for the scholars, as well as staff and parents.

See also

References

The references to myself, Robert L. Taylor, should read that I graduated in 1968. (By 1998 i was a little too old to have been attending high school!)

Boys' schools in Zambia
Luanshya
Buildings and structures in Copperbelt Province
Secondary schools in Zambia
Educational institutions established in 1957
1957 establishments in Northern Rhodesia